Burah may refer to:
 Burah, the Persian derived name for borax
 Gom Burah or gaon burah, the head of the Bori tribe
 Burah Sara, a village in Iran
 Burah (Dune), a character in the Dune series by Frank Herbert
 Burah region in Maqbanah District in Yemen, as mentioned in the Battle of Taiz

See also
 Borah (disambiguation)
 Bura (disambiguation)
 Bora (disambiguation)
 Burrah, a type of kebab
 Burahol